Ughaiti is a Village or a Gram panchayat. It is located in the Sahaswan block and Bilsi tehsil in Badaun district of Uttar Pradesh state, India. It belongs to Bareilly Division and has two parts. One is Ughati Patti Garvi and the other is Ughaiti Patti Sarki. It is near Ughaiti patti sarki have twelve majra.

Geography 
Ughaiti uttar pradesh is strategically located 35 km towards west from district headquarters Badaun. 292 km from state capital Lucknow and is well connected by road. It is situated on State Highway no. 51 Badaun - Bijnor.

Facilities 
Police Station
Power House
Post Office
Sarva U.P. Gramin Bank
Indian Oil Petrol Pump
Madhav Ram Inter College
Hanswahini Inter College
Government Veterinary Hospital Ughaiti Garvi
Chaudhary Chirag Singla jim

References

Villages in Budaun district